Tabayesco is a village in the municipality of Haría in the Las Palmas province of northern Lanzarote in the Canary Islands.

Populated places in Lanzarote